Shaye is a given name and surname.

Persons

Given name
 Shaye Cogan
 Shaye Al-Nafisah
 Shaye J. D. Cohen
 Keely Shaye Smith
 Shaye Ali Sharahili
 Lu Shaye

Surname
 Lin Shaye
 Robert Shaye
 Abdulelah Haider Shaye
 Skyler Shaye